Judy Weeks-Rohner is an American politician serving as a member of the Utah House of Representatives from the 33rd district. She is a member of the Republican Party.

Political career 

Before serving in the Utah State Legislature, Weeks-Rohner was a member of the Granite School Board. She also served as the liaison to the State Board of Education under Governor Mike Leavitt. In 2021, Weeks-Rohner led a signature-gathering effort to force a referendum on repealing a major tax reform package approved by the state legislature in 2019 which cut income taxes and increased a per-child exemption but increased taxes on "food, fuel and some services." However, the Legislature voted to repeal the tax reform bill before the referendum could take place.

After Craig Hall resigned his House seat to accept an appointment by Gov. Spencer Cox to serve as a state judge, Weeks-Rohner ran to replace him and won the special election.

In the 2022 legislative session, Weeks-Rohner served on the Executive Offices and Criminal Justice Appropriations Subcommittee, House Education Committee, and the House Judiciary Committee.

Political positions

Tax policy

Weeks-Rohner supports repealing the food tax in Utah. She criticized her fellow Republicans for not joining in supporting for the food tax repeal proposal by Rosemary Lesser, saying, "I think they’re listening to big businesses and corporations, and I want them to listen to the common man."

References

Republican Party members of the Utah House of Representatives
21st-century American politicians
Year of birth missing (living people)
Living people
Women state legislators in Utah
21st-century American women politicians
School board members in Utah